Tryfon Tzanetis was a Greek footballer and a later manager. He was best known as a great figure for AEK Athens during the 30's and 40's, partnering Kleanthis Maropoulos in AEK's front line. Tzanetis also contributed to AEK by coaching the club during the 50's and 60's.

Early life
Tzanetis was born in 1918 in Smyrna (today's Izmir), from Naxian parents. After the Asia Minor disaster, his family moved to Athens and installed at the district of Nea Ionia.

Club career

Tzanetis started playing football in 1932 at Eleftheroupoli. In 1933, AEK Athens scouted him and he signed a sport's card with the club. He started from the youth teams of AEK where he was promoted to the first team in 1935, alongside Maropoulos and participated in an official match. He was a member to the great team of the "yellow-blacks" in the late 30s, having teammates, such as Kleanthis Maropoulos, Spyros Sklavounos and Spyros Kontoulis. He was a great player and a great man. Initially an attacker, but later in his career he became a central defender, when the then coach, Jack Beby converted him, in the WM system that he applied since he came to Greece in 1948. His presence was imposing. He was insightful, extremely fast, creative and team and in addition to being an aggressive midfielder, he was also distinguished by his inhibitions. With AEK he won 4 times the FCA Championship, 2 consecutive Panhellenic Championships and 3 Greek Cups, including the first domestic double by a Greek club in 1939.

International career
He wore once the jersey of Greece on 25 May 1949, against Italy B in a 2–3 defeat, with Tzanetis coming from the bench on the 46th minute.

Managerial career
In 1950 after his playing days were over, Tzanetis took up coaching Egaleo in the 1st division of Athens for a season before returning to AEK Athens. He found himself as the coach of AEK in many periods in the 50s and 60s (1951, 1954, 1956, 1961 and 1965), leading the club to the Greek Cup in 1966. Tzanetis also coached Apollon Athens which was the last club of his career. He was also a selector of the Greece military national football team, where he won the World Military Cup in 1962. From 1960 to 1964 (in two different periods) he was the coach of Greece with a record of 5 wins, 1 draw and 5 losses.

After football
He identified on the pitch and in life with Kleanthis Maropoulos, with whom he remained friends and partners in a sporting goods store in the center of Athens, until the end of the latter's life, in 1991. Seven years later, Tzanetis died.

Honours

As a player

AEK Athens
Panhellenic Championship: 1938–39, 1939–40
Greek Cup: 1938–39, 1948–49, 1949–50
Athens FCA Championship: 1940, 1946, 1947, 1950

As a coach

AEK Athens
Greek Cup: 1965–66

Greece military 
World Military Cup: 1962

See also
List of one-club men in association football

References

1918 births
1998 deaths
AEK Athens F.C. players
Emigrants from the Ottoman Empire to Greece
AEK Athens F.C. managers
Greece international footballers
Smyrniote Greeks
Association football forwards
Greek football managers
Association football central defenders
Eleftheroupoli F.C. players
Footballers from İzmir
Footballers from Athens
Greek footballers